Nico Lemoine (born April 10, 2000) is an American professional soccer player who plays as a winger.  He is currently a free agent.

Career

Youth 
Lemoine spent time with De Anza Force before joining the San Jose Earthquakes academy. He would spend time training with the Earthquakes USL affiliate club, Reno 1868, during the summer of 2017.

Lemoine joined the Houston Dynamo academy during 2018. He would lead the Dynamo U-19s with six assists during the 2018 U.S. Soccer Development Academy season.

Professional 
Lemoine signed a contract with the Dynamo's USL Championship affiliate, Rio Grande Valley FC, ahead of the 2019 season. He made his professional debut on March 23, coming on as a substitute in a 2–2 draw with El Paso Locomotive. In the Toros next game, Lemoine scored his first professional goal in a 2–1 loss to the Tulsa Roughnecks. On September 15 he scored in a 2–1 loss to Sacramento Republic.  Lemoine ended his first pro season with 2 goals and 1 assist from 19 games for the Toros

On June 11, 2020, Lemoine signed a contract with the Dynamo.  He made his Dynamo debut on July 13, coming off the bench in a 3–3 draw with LAFC.  Lemoine ended the 2020 season with 11 appearances, all as a substitute, as Houston finished last in the Western Conference, missing out on the playoffs.

During the 2021 season, Lemoine made just 1 appearance as the Dynam finished last in the West again.

On March 9, 2022, Lemoine was loaned to USL Championship club Oakland Roots for the 2022 season.  On April 26, after not making Oakland's match day squad during the first 9 games of the season, the Dynamo recalled Lemoine and waived him.

Career Statistics

References

External links
Profile at RGV Toros Website

2000 births
Living people
American soccer players
Association football midfielders
People from Livermore, California
Rio Grande Valley FC Toros players
Soccer players from California
Sportspeople from Alameda County, California
USL Championship players
Houston Dynamo FC players
Major League Soccer players
Oakland Roots SC players
De Anza Force players